The Decision of Christopher Blake is a 1948 American drama film based upon the Moss Hart play. It was adapted by Ranald MacDougall and directed by Peter Godfrey. The film stars Alexis Smith, Robert Douglas, Cecil Kellaway, Ted Donaldson, John Hoyt and Harry Davenport and was released by Warner Bros. on December 23, 1948.

Plot
Evelyn and Ken Blake are about to break up their marriage and get a divorce. While she still loves him, she can not forgive his infidelity. Their son, 12-year-old Christopher, is hurt and confused. The divorce suit goes to court and Ted must choose which of his parents he wants to stay with, and is unable to decide.

Cast 
Alexis Smith as Evelyn Blake
Robert Douglas as Ken Blake
Cecil Kellaway as Judge Alexander Adamson
Ted Donaldson as Christopher Blake
John Hoyt as Mr. Caldwell
Harry Davenport as Courtroom Attendant
Mary Wickes as Clara
Art Baker as Mr. Kurlick

Reception
Bosley Crowther of The New York Times said, "Whatever meaning and emotion were in Moss Hart's stage play, "Christopher Blake," which attempted to show the mental anguish of a boy whose parents were being divorced, have been lost, mislaid or stolen from the film based upon the play."

References

External links 
 

1948 drama films
1948 films
American black-and-white films
American drama films
Films directed by Peter Godfrey
Films scored by Max Steiner
Films with screenplays by Ranald MacDougall
Warner Bros. films
1940s English-language films
1940s American films